John Browne was an Anglican priest in Ireland in the 18th century.

Browne was educated at Trinity College, Dublin. He was a prebendary of Tullabracky in Limerick Cathedral from 1727 to 1733; and archdeacon of Limerick from 1733 until his resignation in 1740.

References

Archdeacons of Limerick
Alumni of Trinity College Dublin
18th-century Irish Anglican priests